This is a list of awards received by American blues guitarist Stevie Ray Vaughan. He debuted on the music scene in 1983 as the frontman of Double Trouble. Through his group and collaborative work, he became one of the first musicians to be inducted into the Austin Music Hall of Fame in 1982. He was also inducted into the Blues Hall of Fame in 2000. Winning many magazine polls, the guitarist was honored by former Texas governor Mark White in 1985. Vaughan has won 6 Grammy Awards, 10 Austin Music Awards, and 5 W. C. Handy Awards, being nominated for "Best Contemporary Blues Male Artist," as well as winning awards for "Entertainer of the Year" and "Instrumentalist of the Year."

Grammy Awards
The Grammy Awards are awarded annually by the National Academy of Recording Arts and Sciences in the United States. Vaughan received 6 awards out of 13 nominations.

|-
|rowspan="2" align="center"| 1984
|"Texas Flood"
|Best Traditional Blues Performance
|
|-
|"Rude Mood"
|Best Rock Instrumental Performance
|
|-
|rowspan="2" align="center"| 1985
|"Voodoo Child (Slight Return)"
|Best Rock Instrumental Performance
|
|-
|Blues Explosion
|Best Traditional Blues Performance
|
|-
|align="center"| 1986
|"Say What!"
|Best Rock Instrumental Performance
|
|-
|rowspan="2" align="center"| 1988
|"Pipeline"
|Best Rock Instrumental Performance
|
|-
|"Say What" (live version)
|Best Rock Instrumental Performance
|
|-
|rowspan="2" align="center"| 1990
|In Step
|Best Contemporary Blues Performance
|
|-
|"Travis Walk"
|Best Rock Instrumental Performance
|
|-
|rowspan="2" align="center"| 1991
|Family Style
|Best Contemporary Blues Performance
|
|-
|"D/FW"
|Best Rock Instrumental Performance
|
|-
|rowspan="2" align="center"| 1993
|The Sky Is Crying
|Best Contemporary Blues Album
|
|-
| "Little Wing"
|Best Rock Instrumental Performance
|
|-

Austin Music Awards
The Austin Music Awards are presented annually in Austin by The Austin Chronicle. Vaughan has received 10 Austin Music Awards, along with an induction into the Austin Music Hall of Fame.

|-
|rowspan="6" align="center"| 1983
|Texas Flood
|Album of the Year
|
|-
|"Love Struck Baby"
|Best Single
|
|-
|"Pride and Joy"
|Best Single
|
|-
|"Love Struck Baby"
|Song of the Year
|
|-
|"Texas Flood"
|Song of the Year
|
|-
|"Pride and Joy"
|Song of the Year
|
|-
|rowspan="4" align="center"| 1984
|Couldn't Stand the Weather
|Album of the Year
|
|-
|"Cold Shot" / "Honey Bee"
|Best Single
|
|-
|"Cold Shot"
|Song of the Year
|
|-
|"Couldn't Stand the Weather"
|Song of the Year
|
|-
|rowspan="4" align="center"| 1985
|Soul to Soul
|Album of the Year
|
|-
|"Change It" / "Look at Little Sister"
|Best Single
|
|-
|"Change It"
|Song of the Year
|
|-
|"Say What!"
|Song of the Year
|
|-
|rowspan="2" align="center"| 1986
|Live Alive
|Album of the Year
|
|-
|"Willie the Wimp"
|Song of the Year
|
|-
|rowspan="7" align="center"| 1989
|In Step
|Album of the Decade
|
|-
|In Step
|Album of the Year
|
|-
|"Crossfire"
|Best Single
|
|-
|"The House Is Rockin'"
|Best Single
|
|-
|"Crossfire"
|Song of the Decade
|
|-
|"Texas Flood"
|Song of the Decade
|
|-
|"Crossfire"
|Song of the Year
|
|-
|rowspan="5" align="center"| 1990
|Family Style
|Album of the Year
|
|-
|"Tick Tock"
|Best Single
|
|-
|"White Boots"
|Best Single
|
|-
|"Hard to Be"
|Best Single
|
|-
|"Tick Tock"
|Song of the Year
|
|-
|rowspan="3" align="center"| 1991
|The Sky Is Crying
|Album of the Year
|
|-
|"Life By the Drop"
|Best 45
|
|-
|"The Sky Is Crying"
|Best 45
|
|-
|align="center"| 1992
|In the Beginning
|Album of the Year
|
|-

Austin Music Hall of Fame
Vaughan was one of the first inductees into the Austin Music Hall of Fame.

|-
|align="center"| 1982
|Stevie Ray Vaughan
|Hall of Fame
|
|-

W. C. Handy Awards

|-
|rowspan="3" align="center"| 1984
|Stevie Ray Vaughan
|Best Contemporary Blues Male Artist
|
|-
|Stevie Ray Vaughan
|Entertainer of the Year
|
|-
|Stevie Ray Vaughan
|Instrumentalist of the Year
|
|-
|align="center"| 1985
|Stevie Ray Vaughan
|Instrumentalist of the Year
|
|-
|rowspan="2" align="center"|2000
|In Session
|Blues Album of the Year
|
|-
|In Session
|Contemporary Blues Album of the Year
|
|-

Rock and Roll Hall of fame
Although he became eligible for the Rock and Roll Hall of Fame in 2008, he didn't appear on a nominations roster until 2014. In 2015, he, along with Double Trouble, were inducted into the Rock and Roll Hall of Fame. Jimmie Vaughan accepted the award on his behalf.

Notes

Vaughan, Stevie Ray